Vladimir Anatolyevich Mukhankin (born 22 April 1960) is a Russian serial killer, convicted for the murder of 9 people in Rostov Oblast in 1995.

Background
Vladimir Anatolyevich Mukhankin was born on 22 April 1960, in the Zernogradsky District in Rostov Oblast, RSFSR, Soviet Union. Mukhankin claimed his father abandoned his pregnant mother for another woman before his birth, and that he had been named in honor of Vladimir Lenin who was also born on 22 April. During his childhood he was abused at home, also by classmates at school (receiving only 7 years of education), and began to regularly run away from home. As an adult Mukhankin eventually married, and had a son that later drowned in the Kuban River.

Murders
In 1995, Mukhankin committed nine murders and two attempted murders, targeting women and girls, mostly in the town of Shakhty, Rostov Oblast. Victims were stabbed or suffocated, some of them tortured before death. Their bodies would be dismembered and sometimes burned. Rape was not a part of his usual modus operandi, but had done so in at least one case; Mukhankin had violated a 13-year-old victim whom he then killed. Mukhankin mainly targeted women and young girls to kill, and it is believed he had an extreme hatred of women.

Arrest and conviction
On 1 May 1995, Mukhankin was arrested after an attack on a woman and her daughter, where the woman was killed but the daughter survived and was able to report Mukhankin as the assailant to the police. After his arrest, it was discovered that he had a plan to kill 40 policemen (the list was found) as revenge for years spent in prison, but was caught before he could enact his plan.

Mukhankin was unremorseful in court and at first said that he considered himself a disciple of Andrei Chikatilo, a notorious serial killer in Russia who had operated in Rostov Oblast a decade earlier; however, he later referred to Chikatilo as a "chicken". During interrogation he attempted to convince the police he was insane by acting erratically, but a psychiatric examination found him to be sane. Mukhankin was found guilty of 22 crimes, including eight murders (including three minors) and sentenced to the death penalty, but the sentence was commuted to life imprisonment. Mukhankin is currently serving his imprisonment at the Black Dolphin Prison in Orenburg Oblast.

See also
 List of Russian serial killers

Sources
 Охотники на маньяков часть 1
 Охотники на маньяков часть 2

1960 births
Inmates of Black Dolphin Prison
Living people
Male serial killers
People convicted of murder by Russia
People from Zernogradsky District
Prisoners sentenced to death by Russia
Prisoners sentenced to life imprisonment by Russia
Russian murderers of children
Russian prisoners sentenced to death
Russian rapists
Russian serial killers
Violence against women in Russia